was a protected cruiser of the Imperial Japanese Navy, designed and built by the Armstrong Whitworth shipyards in Elswick, in the United Kingdom. The name Takasago derives from a location in Hyōgo Prefecture, near Kobe.

Background

Takasago was an improved design of the Argentine Navy cruiser Veinticinco de Mayo designed by Sir Philip Watts, who was also responsible for the design of the cruiser  and the s. The Chilean Navy cruiser Chacabuco was the sister ship to Takasago; the Japanese cruiser  was sometimes also regarded as a sister ship to Takasago, due to the similarity in their design, armament and speed, although the two vessels were of different classes.

Takasago was laid down in April 1896, as Elswick hull number 660, as a private venture by Armstrong Whitworth, and was sold to Japan in July 1896. Launch occurred on 18 May 1897 and she was completed on 6 April 1898.

Design
Takasago was a typical Elswick cruiser design, with a steel hull, divided into 109 waterproof compartments, a low forecastle, two smokestacks, and two masts. She made use of Harvey armor, which was intended to be able to protect against the impact of even an 8-inch armor-piercing shell. The prow was reinforced for ramming.  The power plant was a triple expansion reciprocating steam engine with four cylindrical boilers, driving two screws. In this aspect, the design was almost identical to that of Yoshino, however in terms of armament, Takasago was more heavily armed.

The main armament of Takasago were two separate 20.3 cm/45 Type 41 naval guns behind gun shields, which were placed on bow and stern.  Secondary armament consisted of ten Elswick QF 6 inch /40 naval gun quick-firing guns mounted in casemates and in sponsons near the bridge. Takasago was also equipped with twelve QF 12-pounder 12 cwt naval guns, six QF 3-pounder Hotchkiss guns and five  torpedo tubes.

Service record
The first overseas deployment of Takasago was in 1900, to support Japanese naval landing forces which occupied the port city of Tianjin in northern China during the Boxer Rebellion, as part of the Japanese contribution to the Eight-Nation Alliance.

After participating in a naval review held at Spithead on 16 August 1902 (originally scheduled from 24 to 27 June), Takasago and Asama visited numerous European and Asian ports (Singapore, Colombo, Suez, Malta, Lisbon on the way, Antwerp, Cork and Cardiff during their stay, and Gibraltar, Naples, Aden, Colombo, Singapore, Bangkok and Hong Kong on the way back). The ships returned safely to Japan on 28 November 1902.

Russo-Japanese War
With the start of the Russo-Japanese War of 1904–1905, Takasago participated in the bombardment of the Port Arthur naval base on the morning following the pre-emptive strike by Japanese destroyers against the Russian fleet in the opening stages of the naval Battle of Port Arthur, serving as flagship for Admiral Dewa Shigeto.
While participating in the subsequent blockade of the Russian fleet within the confines of the harbor, Takasago captured the Russian Far East Shipping Company merchant ship Manchuria, which was accepted into Japanese service as a prize of war and renamed Kantō Maru.

On 10 March 1904, Takasago participated in an attack on the Russian cruiser . Takasago was also in the Battle of the Yellow Sea on 10 August.

She returned to Japan for overhaul in October 1904. The flooding could not be controlled, and her life boats could not be launched at night under blizzard conditions and heavy seas. Takasago sank in position , with the loss of 273 officers and crew. Some 162 survivors were rescued by the accompanying cruiser . Takasago was the last major Japanese warship lost in the Russo-Japanese War. Future Russian Admiral Aleksandr Kolchak, then a minesweeper captain at Port Arthur with the Russian Pacific Squadron, was credited with having placed the mine, and was awarded the prestigious Order of St Anna and Sword of St George for the action.

Gallery

Notes

References

External links

Cruisers of the Imperial Japanese Navy
Ships built by Armstrong Whitworth
Ships built on the River Tyne
1897 ships
Naval ships of Japan
Russo-Japanese War cruisers of Japan
Ships sunk by mines
Shipwrecks in the Yellow Sea
Maritime incidents in 1904
Shipwrecks of the Russo-Japanese War
Naval magazine explosions